Michael K. Lee (born June 5, 1973) is an American theater actor and singer who resides in Seoul, Korea.

Early life 
Lee was born in Brooklyn, New York to Susie and Won Yub Lee. He was raised in Salamanca, a small Native American reservation town near Buffalo, where his father, a surgeon, set up his practice. Theirs was the only Asian American family in the town. He played both violin and piano, and performed in the Greater Buffalo Youth Orchestra. He is a graduate of Stanford University, where he studied psychology on a pre-med track and sang with the Stanford Fleet Street Singers.

Acting career
Lee's career began in 1995, when he was cast in the second national tour of Miss Saigon. He auditioned for the show on three occasions before he was cast. Lee went on to join the Broadway production of Miss Saigon (Thuy). His other Broadway credits include Jesus Christ Superstar (Simon Zealotes), Pacific Overtures (Kayama), and Rent.

From 2015 to 2016, Lee starred in the musical Allegiance on Broadway, a show about George Takei's life experiences (who starred in the musical alongside Lee). In the show, Lee reprised the role of Frankie Suzuki, a character based on real-life political activist Frank S. Emi. The role had won him the San Diego Theatre Critics Circle's Craig Noel Award for Outstanding Featured Performance in 2012, during the Allegiance's run at the Old Globe there. Allegiance began Broadway previews on October 6, 2015, and opened on November 8, 2015, running through early 2016.

Lee has starred in numerous productions in Seoul, including Jesus Christ Superstar (Jesus), Miss Saigon (Chris), Priscilla, Queen of the Desert (Tick), Notre Dame de Paris (Gringoire), Amour (Dusoleil), and Gone with the Wind (Ashley). His other international credits include Where Elephants Weep in Phnom Penh, Cambodia, They’re Playing Our Song in Manila, Philippines (opposite Lea Salonga), and A Twist of Fate in Singapore (opposite Laura Michelle Kelley).

Lee portrayed Tommy in The Who's Tommy, winning a Seattle Footlight Award for Best Actor in a Musical; Judas and Jesus in Jesus Christ Superstar, Aladdin in Disney's Aladdin: A Musical Spectacular; and Jamie Willerstein in The Last Five Years.

Personal life 
As of 2013, he lives in Seoul, Korea. He is married to actress Kim Varhola.

Theater

Filmography

TV Series

TV Shows
2020: King of Mask Singer (MBC), contestant as "Half Moon Prince" (episodes 247–248)

References

1973 births
Living people
Male actors from New York City
Stanford University alumni
21st-century American singers
American male actors of Korean descent